Shima Mehri (born 1 January 1980 in Tehran) is an Iranian female biker. Shima Mehri is the first Iranian girl who has ridden 805 km, in 12 hours non-stop, and 1700 km, 19 hours non-stop. Also she is the first Harley-Davidson Head Road Captain Lady.  Shima is a member of EMSF (Emirates Motor Sport Federation).

Biography
Shima is the oldest child of her family. She lives in Dubai and rides her Harley-Davidson as a professional biker. She is also working as a television presenter, model, translator, and maths teacher.
When she was a child, she lived in Austria. She would watch girls riding motorcycles and dream of one day being able to ride one of her own.

Professional activity
In 2008 she moved to Dubai. Right after that she got her motorcycle riding license and bought her first bike which was Harley Davidson Sportster 803. In 2012 she had done her first riding Challenge. She road 805 km in 12 hours non-stop, and became the first Lady in the Gulf Cooperation Council (GCC) who did such a challenge. In 2014, she got the title of Road Captain, and became the first lady in GCC to achieve such a title. In 2015 she did her second challenge, 1700 km non-stop ride in 19 hours. On 1 April 2016, she decided to achieve the title of the first lady in the world who has ridden 2500 km non-stop in 24 hours. But unfortunately because of a sandstorm after 1000 km she had a dreadful accident. She got spine fractures, but also such a dangerous accident couldn’t stop her and just after 2 months she has started riding again. In May 2016 she became the first lady in the world who became as the Head Road Captain.

World Riding Tour
In 2013, Shima Mehri road in Austria and Hungary, 2000 km in 3 weeks. Also in 2014 she rode the entire Historic Route 66 in 2 weeks.

See also 
 List of Iranian women

References

External links

Long Distance Riders
Interview With The National Newspaper
Interview with Middle East Eye 
Interview with PRI's The World 
Interview with The Moto Lady 
Interview with Global Voices 
Interview with Oximity 
Interview with T Emirates: The New York Times Style Magazine 
Interview with ETC 
Interview with Bloomberg Businessweek 
HOG Magazine 
HOG Magazine 
HOG Magazine 

1980 births
20th-century Iranian women
21st-century Iranian women
Living people
Long-distance motorcycle riders